WPCU-LP (106.9 FM, "Faith FM") was a radio station broadcasting a Contemporary Christian format. Licensed to Panama City, Florida, United States, the station served the Panama City area. The station was owned by Covenant Presbyterian Church in Panama City, Inc.

The station went silent on September 2, 2016, due to transmitter, staffing, tower relocation and financial issues. The station did not return to the air within a year of going silent; its license was cancelled on October 4, 2017.

References

External links
 

PCU-LP
PCU-LP
Defunct radio stations in the United States
Radio stations established in 2004
2004 establishments in Florida
Radio stations disestablished in 2017
2017 disestablishments in Florida
Defunct religious radio stations in the United States
PCU-LP